Currie Hall is a hall within the Currie Building, which is an annex to the Mackenzie Building at the Royal Military College of Canada in Kingston, Ontario. It was built in 1922, and is a Recognized Federal Heritage Building.

The hall was designed by Percy Erskine Nobbs and built just after the end of the First World War by Sir Archibald Cameron Macdonell while he was commandant of the Royal Military College of Canada. It was built as a memorial to the Canadian Corps of the Canadian Expeditionary Force. It plays a prominent role in the life of the University. During special events, invited speakers and dignitaries may address the university population or general public from the Great Hall. Many conferences held in Kingston, Ontario may book the halls for lectures or presentations.

The Currie building also houses the Language Centre, administrative offices and Otter Squadron - University Training Plan Non Commissioned Members (UTNCM). The building was named in honour of Lieutenant-General Sir Arthur Currie, who is a National Historic Person of Canada.

Currie Hall is decorated with the crests and battle colours of every unit that fought in France during World War I.

History
At the official opening of Currie Hall at Royal Military College on 17 May 1922, General Sir Arthur Currie remarked:

Under the supervision of Eleanor Milne, then Official Sculptor of Canada (1962–93), Maurice Joanisse, then an apprentice carver, sculpted the Royal Coat of Arms of Canada and Canada's motto, Ad mare usque ad mare (English: From Sea to Sea; French: D'un ocean à l'autre), over the main entrance to the building. Joanisse also sculpted the arms of Sir Archibald Cameron Macdonell and General Currie over the main entrance. Joanisse later served as Official Sculptor of Canada 1993 to 2006.

Decorations

Major Stuart Forbes offered to paint the insignia as a gift to the College. General Macdonnell said that "no greater incentive or inspiration could be given to the Gentlemen Cadets of the Royal Military College of Canada than the sight of the emblems worn by the Canadian Corps."

His Excellency John Ralston Saul (February 2004) described the Currie Hall decorations,

The initials of Canada Corps commanders General Sir Arthur Currie; Sir Edwin Alderson (1915–16), and Sir Julian Byng, 1st Viscount Byng of Vimy (1916–17) are emblazoned on the ceiling of Currie Hall as are the initials of Sir Henry Edward Burstall, Garnet Hughes, General Macdonell, Louis Lipsett, Frederick Oscar Warren Loomis, M. S. Mercer, Sam Steele, R. E. W. Turner, and David Watson.

The badges and battle patches belonging to the units of the 1st, 2nd, 3rd, 4th, and 5th Canadian Divisions of the Canada Corps and the cavalry brigade adorn 132 oak panels on the face of the gallery.

Coats of arms

Nineteen coats of arms tell the story of Canada's experience during the First World War. The first four brigades of the Canada Corps trained in Valcartier and Quebec City. The Corps landed in  Devonport, Devon, in Plymouth Sound. After spending the winter on the Salisbury Plain, they crossed to France. Major battles fought by the corps were the following: Battle of Mount Sorrel; Battle of Flers-Courcelette; Battle of Morval; Battle of Thiepval; Battle of Le Transloy; Battle of the Ancre Heights; Battle of Vimy Ridge; Battle of Arleux; Third Battle of the Scarpe; Battle of Hill 70; Second Battle of Passchendaele;  Battle of Cambrai (1917); Battle of Amiens; Second Battle of the Somme; Battle of the Canal du Nord (including the capture of Bourlon Wood); Battle of Cambrai: October 8–9 (including the Capture of Cambrai).  The corps returned to Canada through the ports of Boulogne-sur-Mer, Paris and London.

Provincial Shields
Edwin Tappan Adney, who had served as engineering officer at the Royal Military College of Canada 1916-1919, created a set of three-dimensional shields of the Canadian provinces that adorn Currie Hall.

Artwork
[[File:Painting by Emily Warren in Currie Hall Royal Military College of Canada.JPG|thumb|upright|Painting Canada's Tribute, The Great War 1914–1919 " by Emily Warren]]

In 1947, Emily Warren's two large, canvasses entitled Canada's Tribute, The Great War 1914–1919 and Placing the Canadian Colours on Wolf's Monument in Westminster Abbey''. Canada's Tribute was hung in the Currie Memorial Hall at RMC. The paintings depict the 52 sets of colours, standards and guidons being placed for safekeeping on the Wolfe Monument in Westminster Abbey. The paintings were initially hung in the Canadian Parliament Buildings. In 2010, thirty one paintings of Canadian war memorials by F.A. (Tex) Dawson were unveiled outside Currie Hall.

Memorial staircase

As you enter the Mackenzie Building, which is connected to the Currie Building, you immediately see a staircase which was designated the memorial stairway after the First World War by RMC Cadet #151 Sir Archibald Cameron Macdonell, RMC Commandant 1919-1925. The staircase is decorated with the photographs of 358 alumni including Captain Nichola Goddard who had died in military service.

Memorial and Commemorative Stained Glass windows

Outside Currie Hall, stained glass windows feature images of the Royal Canadian Sea Cadets, Navy League Cadet Corps (Canada) and Navy League Wrennette Corp. In memory of David H. Gibson, C.B.E. National President, Navy League of Canada, 1938-1952 a stained glass window features images of a young sailor and God behind the ships' wheel. The window is dedicated to Canadians who in defence of the country went down to the sea in ships. The window includes a poem by H.R. Gillarm:

Outside Currie Hall, on the first floor, two stained glass windows feature images of a military saint holding a staff and a shield and a military saint with a horse and three angels. The subject of the middle window is Truth Duty Valour, Royal Military College of Canada with the College shield and armour.

References

 Stained glass in the Royal Military College of Canada Currie Hall 

Heritage sites in Ontario
Buildings and structures in Kingston, Ontario
Royal Military College of Canada
Percy Erskine Nobbs buildings